The Volkswagen Tavendor is a mid-size crossover SUV with three-row seating manufactured by the German automaker Volkswagen through FAW-Volkswagen joint venture in China since 2022. It is positioned between the larger Talagon and the smaller Tayron within FAW-Volkswagen SUV line-up.

Overview 

The Tavendor was unveiled in August 2022. It is based on the MQB Evo architecture, sharing the similar dimensions and powertrain options with the similarly sized Teramont and the larger Talagon.

Powertrain 
The Tavendor is fitted with turbocharged 2.0-liter TSI four-cylinder engine, available in two power output options. The base model will produce , with the more powerful variant producing . Both are paired with the seven-speed DSG automatic transmission with front-wheel drive or all-wheel drive (4Motion).

References

External links 

Tavendor
Cars introduced in 2022
Mid-size sport utility vehicles
Crossover sport utility vehicles
Front-wheel-drive vehicles
All-wheel-drive vehicles